The Kingstown lifeboat disaster occurred on Christmas Eve 1895 off Kingstown (now Dún Laoghaire), Ireland, when the Kingstown lifeboat was capsized while attempting to rescue the crew of the stricken SS Palme.  The crew of fifteen were lost.  The event is commemorated annually at Dún Laoghaire Harbour.

The Palme

The Palme, a 1,114 ton barque, was owned by the Eriksson family of Mariehamn, Finland, then part of the Russian Empire. She sailed under the Russian flag of horizontal white, blue, and red. On 18 December she set sail from Liverpool bound for South America to import hardwood.  She was commanded by Captain Wiren.  He was accompanied by his wife and child. There was a crew of seventeen, three of whom spoke English.

Weather

A storm described as "the most severe of the century" developed.  The Palme tried to seek shelter in Dublin Bay, but was driven southeast.  It was mid-winter and extremely cold. The sea was so heavy that waves were crashing over the lighthouse at the end of the East Pier of Dún Laoghaire.
On Tuesday 24 December the Palme was seen dragging her anchor off Merrion strand.  The Palme was in danger of being smashed on the rocks.  She fired distress rockets.

The disaster

A new lifeboat, Civil Service Number One had recently been delivered to Kingstown (now Dún Laoghaire).  Under Coxswain Alexander Williams it went to assist the Palme. As she approached the Palme, the crew lowered the sails and rowed.  Then, in full public view, the lifeboat was raised by a mighty wave and then capsized. Some of the lifeboat crew managed to climb onto the upturned hull.  The crew of the Palme then tried to launch their longboat, in the hope of rescuing their rescuers.  This longboat was smashed by the waves. The older lifeboat Hannah Pickard, under Coxswain Horner, then went to sea.  She was also capsized but righted herself and her crew all got back on board.  She was driven ashore at Vance's Harbour, Blackrock. The Poolbeg lifeboat, under Coxswain Captain Dalton, was also launched.  She found conditions 'impossible' and had to turn back.  Two tugs, Flying Sprite and Flying Swallow also tried and failed. All hope of rescuing the Palme was now abandoned.  On Christmas Day, 25 December, crowds watched and prayed as the Palme was being broken by the gales.  There was widespread public and press interest.

Rescue

On St. Stephen's Day 26 December, the Irish Lights steamer Tearaght under Captain McCombie managed to reach the Palme and rescue all twenty on board.  In addition, they rescued the ship's cat. By then eight bodies of the lifeboatmen had been recovered.  In time, all fifteen bodies were found.

Aftermath

The funeral was the largest seen in Dún Laoghaire.  Flags were lowered in all European ports. All fifteen were buried together in Deans Grange Cemetery. A fund was raised to support their dependents. There were donations from the ship's owners in Finland and from 'the people of Russia'. There is a plaque on the old lifeboat station wall and a granite memorial. Every year the event is remembered. At noon every Christmas Eve there is a procession along the East Pier, led by a piper. A short service is then held.

Crew

Coxswain Alexander Williams, age 35, married with 6 children
Henry Williams (his father and ex-coxswain), age 60, married with 3 sons (including Alexander)
John Baker, age 33 married with 3 children.
John Bartley, aged 45, married with two children.
Edward Crowe, age 30, married no children.
Thomas Dunphy, age 31, married 3 children.
William Dunphy (his brother), age 40 married with 6 children.
Francis McDonald, his son was born to his widow early in 1896.
Edward Murphy, age 30, married with 3 children.
Patrick Power, age 22, single.
James Ryan, age 24, single.
George Saunders, age 30, married 1 posthumous son born 8 months after his death.
Francis Saunders (his brother), age 27, married with 5 children.
Edward Shannon, age 28, married with 4 children.
Henry Underhill, age 32 years, married, no children.

References

Shipwrecks in the Irish Sea
Maritime incidents in Ireland
Maritime incidents in 1895
1895 in Ireland
Dún Laoghaire
Shipwrecks of Ireland
1895 disasters in Ireland